GR7 can be:

 The GR 7 long-distance footpath in Spain, Andorra and France 
 A version of the RAF Harrier II military aeroplane